Perito (Cilentan: Prito) is a town and comune in the province of Salerno in the Campania region of south-western Italy. As of 2011 its population was of 1,007.

History
In the Middle Ages Perito had an important role as fortified town in control of the valleys below. From 1801 to 1860 it was a hamlet of Orria, then it became an independent municipality.

Geography
Perito is a hill town located in Cilento, included into its national park. The municipal territory, partly crossed by Alento river, borders with Cicerale, Lustra, Monteforte Cilento, Orria, Prignano Cilento, Rutino and  Salento. It counts a single hamlet (frazione): Ostigliano (pop.: 431).

Demographics

Gallery

See also
Cilentan dialect

References

External links

 Perito official website
 Perito on comuni.italiani.it

Cities and towns in Campania
Localities of Cilento